The Albanian barbel (Luciobarbus albanicus) is a ray-finned fish species in the family Cyprinidae. It is often referred to as "Albanian barbel" in a literal translation of its scientific name.

Distribution and ecology
It occurs from the Mornos' to the Thyamis Rivers' drainage basins, and in Lake Amvrakia, Ioannina and Trichonida; it is absent from the Acheron and its tributaries, however. In addition, it is also found in the Pineios River's drainage basin on the Peloponnese. Though its range is not large, it is quite abundant and not considered a threatened species by the IUCN.

The natural habitats of this fish are the lower course of rivers, lakes and water storage areas, over muddy or sandy bottom. Larvae and young fish gather in schools containing few if any other fishes in brackish bays and harbours. Adults are more solitary and live preferably in freshwater. L. albanicus is an omnivore, eating aquatic invertebrates (mainly insect larvae), algae and other plants, and detritus. They spawn in late spring to mid-summer (May to July) in slow-moving water over sandy ground at lake beaches and in river estuaries. A single female's eggs will be fertilised by the sperm of several (up to 7) males. This species becomes sexually mature at 3 or 4 years of age. It is long-lived, and can get up to 14 years old.

Footnotes

References
 
  (2008): Natural hybridization of Barbus bocagei x Barbus comizo (Cyprinidae) in Tagus River basin, central Spain [English with French abstract]. Cybium 32(2): 99-102. PDF fulltext
  (2007): Evolutionary origin of Lake Tana's (Ethiopia) small Barbus species: indications of rapid ecological divergence and speciation. Anim. Biol. 57(1): 39-48.  (HTML abstract)

Luciobarbus
Fish of Europe
Endemic fauna of Greece
Epirus (region)
Taxa named by Franz Steindachner
Fish described in 1870
Taxonomy articles created by Polbot